Atsushi Ito may refer to:

, Japanese actor
, Japanese footballer
, Japanese sport wrestler